Zulueta is a Cuban village and consejo popular ("popular council", i.e. hamlet) of the municipality of Remedios, in Villa Clara Province. It is considered the Cuban birthplace of football and, with a population of ca. 10,000 is the most populated village in the municipality after Remedios.

History
The village was founded in 1869 and in 1876 was connected to the railway network. Until the administrative reform of 1977, it was an autonomous municipality of 117 km²,  that included the villages of Floridanos and Guadalupe.

In the 1907 census Zulueta, which was a barrio at the time was switched from being a part of the municipality of Camajuaní to Remedios.

Geography
Zulueta is located on a valley between Remedios (15 km north) and Placetas (13 km south), and is crossed in the middle by a road named "Carretera a Zulueta". It is 22 km far from Camajuaní, 23 from Caibarién, the nearest seaside town, 42 from Cabaiguán, 48 from Santa Clara, and 61 from Sancti Spíritus. 

The railway station is located 3.8 km south, in a small settlement named Tahón. It is part of the Santa Clara-Camajuaní-Morón-Nuevitas line, and has a minor branch to Placetas; part of the old line (1876) Caibarién-Placetas via Camajuaní.

Sport
Zulueta is considered the Cuban birthplace of football because it was one of the first villages in which this sport was brought by Spanish traders, in early 20th century. A testimony of this relationship is, for example, the Monumento al Balón, a stone sculpture of a football ball (balón) located in town's centre, with the inscription Zulueta - Cuna del Fútbol (Zulueta - Birthplace of Football). Another example is the presence of a football ball in the coat of arms.

The football club Villa Clara, playing in Santa Clara at the Sandino Stadium, and representing the city and the whole province; is de jure based in Zulueta and plays some matches at the Camilo Cienfuegos Stadium. It also exists a documentary, named Gol de Cuba, that speaks about Zulueta and its passion for the association football.

See also
Parrandas
Municipalities of Cuba
List of cities in Cuba

References

External links

Zulueta on AccuWeather

Populated places in Villa Clara Province
Populated places established in 1869
1869 establishments in Cuba
Football in Cuba
1869 establishments in North America
1869 establishments in the Spanish Empire